John-Peter Amewu ( born1972) is a Ghanaian politician and current Minister for Railways Development in Ghana and Member of Parliament (MP) for Hohoe Constituency in the Parliament of Ghana. He was the former Minister of Energy and former Minister for Lands And Natural Resources in Ghana.

Early life and education 
John-Peter Amewu was born in 1972 in Wli-Todzi in the Hohoe Municipality of the Volta Region. He attended Hohoe E. P. Senior High School, St. Mary's Seminary/Senior High School, Lolobi and Adisadel College, Cape Coast for his high school education. John-Peter Amewu obtained his bachelor's degree from Kwame Nkrumah University of Science and Technology. He furthered his education and obtained an MBA in finance from University of Ghana, Legon, and proceeded to obtain a postgraduate degree in international energy industry management and a master's degree in petroleum law and policy from University of Dundee (UK).

Personal life 
He identifies himself as a Christian. He is married with four children.

Career 
He is a co-founder of Africa Centre for Energy Policy (ACEP), where he worked as the director of policy and research, and provided policy advice to support a variety of government and private sector projects.

Politics 
John-Peter Amewu is a member of the New Patriotic Party (NPP). He was appointed by His Excellency John Agyekum Kufour as the municipal chief executive for Hohoe Municipal Assembly. He served as municipal chief executive for Hohoe from 2005 to 2009. He was the New Patriotic Party parliamentary candidate for the 2004, general elections and 2008 general elections to contest the then Hohoe North Constituency seat but lost to both to the National Democratic Congress parliamentary candidate Prince Jacob Hayibor.

Cabinet minister
In May 2017, John-Peter Amewu was appointed to serve in the 19-Member Cabinet of Nana Akufo-Addo as the Minister for Lands and Natural Resources (Ghana).

In August 2018, President Nana Addo-Danquah Akufo-Addo changed John-Peter Amewu's portfolio Energy Minister (Ghana). Thus, he became the country's energy minister. He served in this capacity for the rest of the term of the New Patriotic Party government.

After the New Patriotic Party won the 2020 general elections, John-Peter Amewu is again appointed as the Minister for Railways Development.

Member of Parliament

After the December 7, 2020, general elections, John-Peter Amewu became the first New Patriotic Party candidate to win a parliamentary election in Hohoe Constituency since 1992.

References

External links
 Official website

Living people
New Patriotic Party politicians
Cabinet Ministers of Ghana
Kwame Nkrumah University of Science and Technology alumni
University of Ghana alumni
Alumni of the University of Dundee
Year of birth missing (living people)
Ghanaian MPs 2021–2025